Le Toûno (3,018 m) is a mountain of the Pennine Alps, overlooking Saint-Luc in the canton of Valais. It lies within the Val d'Anniviers, west of the Pointe de Tourtemagne.

The summit can be accessed via a trail on the south side of the mountain from Saint-Luc.

References

External links
 Le Toûno on Hikr

Mountains of the Alps
Mountains of Valais
Mountains of Switzerland